Tepicon Hall is a historic dining hall located at Tippecanoe River State Park in Franklin Township, Pulaski County, Indiana. It was built about 1938 by the Works Progress Administration and is nearly all that remains of Camp Tepicon. It is a one-story, "T"-shaped, rustic timber-frame building with a gable roof.  It is sheathed in clapboard siding and board-and-batten siding on the gable ends.

It was listed on the National Register of Historic Places in 1992.

References

Works Progress Administration in Indiana
Park buildings and structures on the National Register of Historic Places in Indiana
Buildings and structures completed in 1938
Buildings and structures in Pulaski County, Indiana
National Register of Historic Places in Pulaski County, Indiana
National Park Service Rustic architecture